Jo Tae-keun (born 26 April 1985) is a South Korean footballer who plays as defender for Thai League 2 club Ayutthaya United F.C.

External links 

1985 births
Living people
Association football midfielders
South Korean footballers
South Korean expatriate footballers
Korea National League players
K League 2 players
Hong Kong Premier League players
Expatriate footballers in Thailand
Expatriate footballers in Hong Kong
Eastern Sports Club footballers
Daejeon Hana Citizen FC players
People from Gumi, North Gyeongsang
Sportspeople from North Gyeongsang Province